Ernesto Razzino (born 14 June 1961) is an Italian former wrestler who competed in the 1984 Summer Olympics, in the 1988 Summer Olympics, and in the 1992 Summer Olympics.

References

External links
 

1961 births
Living people
Olympic wrestlers of Italy
Wrestlers at the 1984 Summer Olympics
Wrestlers at the 1988 Summer Olympics
Wrestlers at the 1992 Summer Olympics
Italian male sport wrestlers